Opposition Deputy Chief Whip is a position in the Opposition Frontbench in the House of Lords. The office holder tends to be shared by two separate members, each responsible for supervising whips in the chamber and reporting to the Leader and Chief Whip. As is the custom in the Lords, the officeholder is acts as a spokesperson, as well as their duties as a Whip. It is currently held by Labour Peer Denis Tunnicliffe (Defence).

House of Lords
Official Opposition (United Kingdom)